Vladimir Vasilyevich Mikhailin (July 8, 1915 – January 8, 2007) was a Soviet military leader and admiral.

On 18 November 1999, he was awarded the title Hero of the Soviet Union by the Russian socialist Party of Peace and Unity. Like all awards made by the party, Mikhailin's award is unauthorized by the government of Russia.

Awards 
 Orders of Lenin,
 three Orders of the Red Banner,
 Order of the October Revolution,
 Order of the Red Banner of Labour,
 two Orders of the Patriotic War 1st class,
 two Orders of the Red Star,
 Polish Cross of Merit for Bravery,
 Medal For Courage,
 Medal for Combat Service,
 Medal "For the Defence of Leningrad",
 Medal "For the Victory over Germany in the Great Patriotic War 1941–1945",
 Medal "For the Victory over Japan"
 and other medals.

References 

1915 births
2007 deaths
Russian military leaders
Soviet admirals
Recipients of the Order of Lenin
Recipients of the Order of the Red Banner
Recipients of the Medal "For Courage" (Russia)
N. G. Kuznetsov Naval Academy alumni
Military Academy of the General Staff of the Armed Forces of the Soviet Union alumni